The Bruins–Flyers rivalry is a National Hockey League (NHL) rivalry between the Boston Bruins and Philadelphia Flyers ice hockey clubs. Both teams compete in the Eastern Conference, but Boston plays in the Atlantic Division and Philadelphia plays in the Metropolitan Division. The two teams have been rivals since the Flyers inception in the 1967 expansion, but was most intense in the 1970s when the two teams met in four playoff series, including the 1974 Stanley Cup Finals, with the Flyers beating the heavily favored Bruins. The rivalry was renewed in the 2010s with both teams meeting in the playoffs for two consecutive years, including a 2010 series, with the Flyers overcoming a 3 games to none deficit to win the series. Historically, both franchises are renowned for their toughness and brawling ways, with the Bruins famously nicknamed the Big Bad Bruins, and the Flyers also famously nicknamed the Broad Street Bullies.

As of January 2023, Boston is one of only six franchises with a winning overall record against Philadelphia (the Anaheim Ducks, Columbus Blue Jackets, Montreal Canadiens, San Jose Sharks, and Tampa Bay Lightning are the other five).

1970s: Big Bad Bruins Vs. Broad Street Bullies
The rivalry took off when the two teams met in the 1974 Stanley Cup Final. Both the Bruins and Flyers were the class of the league, with Boston finish first overall with 113 points while Philadelphia finish second with 112 points, one point behind the Bruins. The Flyers, however, played a more grittier, defensive minded style. The Flyers also led the NHL by amassing 1,750 penalty minutes, which was 603 more minutes than the second most penalized club. The Bruins dominated the rivalry early, amassing a 20–4–4 record against the Flyers since they entered the league, which included the Flyers going winless in Boston Garden since winning their first ever meeting against the Bruins in their history. In addition, no expansion team had yet to beat an Original Six franchise in a Cup Final game since the 1967 NHL expansion, thus making the Flyers huge underdogs entering the final. The Bruins won game 1 at Boston Garden with Bobby Orr scoring a goal with 22 seconds left in the third period of a tie game. In game 2, the Bruins took an early lead, but the Flyers forced overtime on a goal by André Dupont with only 52 seconds remaining in regulation, and Bobby Clarke won it in overtime, sending the series back to Philadelphia tied 1–1. Clarke's overtime goal proved to be the turning point in the series.

The Flyers won the next two games at The Spectrum to take a 3–1 series lead and put Boston on the brink. However, the Bruins soundedly beat the Flyers 5–1 back in Boston Garden. Bruins coach Bep Guidolin described the Flyers as "out-muscled, out-skated, and out-hustled" by the Bruins. The game was a battle as there were a combined 43 penalties, a playoff record, with Flyers legendary enforcer Dave "The Hammer" Schultz averaging a fight per period.

With game 6 back in Philadelphia, the Flyers brought out their good luck charm in Kate Smith, as she sang "God Bless America" to a raucous Spectrum crowd. Smith was considered the Flyers good luck charm, as the Flyers were 36–3–1 when she sang. Flyers center Rick MacLeish deflected a power play goal to take a 1–0 lead, and that was all that Flyers goalie (and eventual Conn Smythe Trophy winner) Bernie Parent needed, as he stopped all 30 shots the Bruins threw at him. The Flyers completed the upset by winning the Stanley Cup in six games.

The Bruins and Flyers played in three consecutive semifinals in 1976, 1977, and 1978. The Flyers defeated the Bruins 4–1 in 1976, but the Bruins took the next two semifinal series (4–0 in 1977, 4–1 in 1978). The Flyers and Bruins during these years lost the Stanley Cup to the Montreal Canadiens. In the 1979–80 season, the Flyers were on a mission to set sports' all-time unbeaten streak, and had to beat or tie the Bruins at the Garden to break the record held by the Montreal Canadiens at 28 games. Despite the Bruins being geared up, the Flyers dominated the Bruins to win 5–2 and break the record. The Flyers went unbeaten for 35 games, a record that has yet to be broken.

21st century

Although both teams remained competitive during the 1980s, 1990s, and 2000s, the Bruins and Flyers did not meet again in the playoffs until 2010 Eastern Conference Semifinals. Prior to the playoff match-up, the two teams squared off in the 2010 Winter Classic at Fenway Park in Boston. The Bruins won 2–1 in overtime on a goal by Bruins forward Marco Sturm.

In Game 1 in the series, the Flyers gave up the first goal less than three minutes into the game and left the first period down 2–0. However, the Flyers would rally and tie the game at 4–4 in the second half of the third period on goals by Mike Richards and Daniel Briere. However, this would only set up the heroics of Bruins forward Marc Savard, who had returned from missing several weeks with a concussion. Savard's overtime goal gave the Bruins a 1–0 series lead. Game 2 was eerily similar to game one, as the Bruins caught the early lead 5:12 into the game and while the Flyers were able to catch up twice, they could not take the lead and a goal by Milan Lucic with less than three minutes to go in the game spelled victory for the Bruins. In game three, the Flyers were finally able to take an early lead themselves, with forward Arron Asham scoring only 2:32 into the game. The lead did not last long though, as Bruins forwards Blake Wheeler and Miroslav Satan answered in quick succession, 1:34 apart and less than two minutes after Asham's goal, to take the lead. The Flyers were unable to score again and with a lackluster third period by Philadelphia, the game ended in a 4–1 Bruins victory. During the game Mike Richards broke the arm of Bruins center David Krejci in a large open ice hit, knocking Krejci out for the rest of the series.

On the brink of a quick elimination, Flyers star Simon Gagne returned for Game 4, which turned into a bizarre mirror version of the first game of the series. After the Flyers took a big 3–1 lead, they saw it melt away on a few bizarre goals. With the Flyers leading late, Bruins forward (and former Flyers superstar) Mark Recchi tied it with 20 seconds left in the game. However, Gagne put an end to it scoring at 14:40 in overtime to keep the Flyers alive and send the series back to Boston. In game five, the Flyers stunned the Bruins by dominating and shutting out the Bruins for a 4–0 victory to climb back into the series. However, the shutout was not held by a single goalie, as Brian Boucher went down with injuries in both of his knees after Flyers defenseman Ryan Parent and Bruins forward Miroslav Satan fell on top of him. This called Michael Leighton back into action, who had only just returned at that very game from a high-ankle sprain that had sidelined him since mid-March. Leighton stayed sharp in game 6, as the Flyers held on for a 2–1 win, almost improbably sending the series back to Boston for a game 7.

Game 7 played out very much like the series itself. The Bruins jumped to a 3–0 lead in the first period. Two of the goals came on the power play due to infractions for high-sticking on Scott Hartnell and Daniel Briere, respectively. This prompted head coach Peter Laviolette to use up his timeout to rally the team. Shortly after, James van Riemsdyk, who had not registered a goal in the playoffs until that point, scored to make it 3–1. The second period was all Flyers, as Hartnell and Briere redeemed themselves by scoring a goal each to tie the game up at 3–3. Overall, the game was relatively low on penalties, with only six minors being called total, but the last one of those, a bench penalty for Too Many Men, came to haunt Boston, as Simon Gagne put the puck in the net for a 4–3 Flyers lead. The Flyers were able to hold on to it and become only the third team in NHL history, the fourth team in the big four American professional sports leagues, to comeback from an 0–3 deficit of games to win that playoff series. The Flyers played in the 2010 Stanley Cup Finals, falling to the Chicago Blackhawks 4 games to 2.

The two teams met again in the 2011 Eastern Conference Semifinals. The Bruins had revenge on their mind and delivered it with force by sweeping the Flyers to advance to their first Eastern Conference Final since 1992. The Bruins then defeated the Tampa Bay Lightning in seven games to advance to the 2011 Stanley Cup Final, where they won their first Stanley Cup since 1972 over the Vancouver Canucks in seven games.

The two franchises would meet again outside in the NHL Outdoors at Lake Tahoe during the 2021 pandemic season where Boston would win the game 7-3 against the Flyers, unfortunately though karma would hit the Bruins big time in the Stanley Cup Qualifier round where the Flyers returned the favor by winning against the Bruins with a score of 4-1.

See also
 National Hockey League rivalries
 76ers–Celtics rivalry

References

Boston Bruins
Philadelphia Flyers
National Hockey League rivalries